The Kocher is a river in Germany.

Kocher may also refer to:

Kocher (surname)
Kocher (crater), lunar impact crater

Medicine
Named after Emil Theodor Kocher:

Kocher manoeuvre, a surgical manoeuvre
Kocher-Debre-Semelaigne syndrome
Kocher's point, a common location for insertion of an extraventricular drain
Kocher approach to the elbow
Kocher incision
Kocher's forceps